Queen Mary's Grammar School (QMGS) is a  boys' grammar school with academy status located on Sutton Road, Walsall, England, about a mile from the town centre and one of the oldest schools in the country.

 The sixth form is coeducational.

Admissions
Admittance to the school is by entrance exam taken at the age of 10/11. Since September 2020, 180 pupils enter the school in September each year, increased gradually from 96 in September 2012. The school has grown from 718 in 2011 to 1,305 in 2022, as a consequence of this sustained expansion.

There is separate admission into the Sixth Form based on academic performance at GCSE. As of 2019, there are over 400 students on roll in the Sixth Form. At this stage of the school, girls are also admitted.

History

Foundation
It was founded in 1554 by George and Nicolas Hawe, two leading townsmen, with Queen Mary I as its royal patron and benefactor. At the time it had about sixty pupils, all boys, and taught Classics almost exclusively.

New sites
The school has grown significantly since its foundation and moved three times. Originally housed in an old town guild-hall near St Matthew’s Church, it moved to Park Street in 1811, into new buildings in Lichfield Street in 1850 (a site now used by Queen Mary's High School) and finally to a purpose-built school on the Mayfield site in 1965.

Academic performance
Queen Mary's performs very well in exams across the board, with consistent success in the sixth form. In 2007, the school became a specialist Language College. The extra funds from this have, amongst other things, facilitated the building of a new wing of the school buildings. The school recently completed work on a new sports hall to support the current gym and swimming facilities. The Science Block was also updated, with new Biology labs being built. A new sixth form block has been constructed and it opened late September 2012. The School is rated as 'Outstanding' by Ofsted.

Traditions
The school's badge is based on the Heraldic badge of Queen Mary and reflects her parentage, being formed from half a Tudor rose (a symbol of Henry VIII) impaled with a sheaf of arrows (a symbol of Catherine of Aragon). The badge was modified slightly during the 2006/2007 school year. A fully red rose was changed to an accurate red and white Tudor rose, which is usually shown with a red outer rose and a white inner one. However the school's Tudor rose, based on early school records, has a white outer rose and a red inner one, which the College of Arms accepts as equally valid. Despite the update, there are still some subtle differences between the current badge and Queen Mary's.

Activities

Extracurricular activities are available for pupils, including plays and drama, sports teams, quiz teams, many subject-related societies, and a Combined Cadet Force contingent, comprising both Army and RAF sections. 
The school has a close relationship with its sister school, Queen Mary's High School. Pupils regularly collaborate in plays held at the boys' school, and yearly musical concerts at Walsall Town Hall.

In sport, the school's Under 18 and Under 16 hockey teams both won the Staffordshire Cup for their respective age groups in the same season.

QMGS also hosted the national finals of Junior Schools' Challenge quiz on 24 June 2007, with a team from the school winning the Plate Final. In 2008, the school hosted and reached the national final, losing in the final.

The school is the only school in the country to have won the UKMT Junior Maths Team Competition twice, doing so in successive years.

The school has a plaque in St George's Church, Ypres, to honour the ex-pupils of the school who died in the Ypres Salient and the Somme during World War One. The plaque was paid for by the QM Club and was formally unveiled during a Year 9 Battlefields trip.

Every year, Year 7 students and the senior prefects visit Westminster Abbey, London to commemorate their founder on the Friday closest to 6 July. On this day, the youngest Year 7 pupil jointly lays a wreath with the Captain of School senior prefect.

Project Horizon

Project Horizon is the school's near space programme, founded in 2012, which runs annual missions. A small payload carrying cameras and tracking hardware is lifted by a high-altitude balloon filled with helium gas into the stratosphere until the balloon bursts, allowing the payload to descend back to the ground. Film footage and still images of the payload's journey are recorded throughout the entire flight, capturing views of Earth from the stratosphere.

The project has received national media attention, including appearances on the BBC and ITV.

Notable former pupils

 David J. Brown (cricketer)
 Colin Charvis, Rugby Union player - British and Irish Lions and Captain of Wales
 Vernon Coleman, Conspiracy theorist, author and AIDS denialist
 Anthony Culverwell,  DJ and turntablist
 David Ennals, Baron Ennals, Labour MP from 1974-83 for Norwich North, and from 1964-70 for Dover
 Prof. Martin Ennals, Ariel F. Sallows Professor of Human Rights in 1991 at the University of Saskatchewan, Secretary-General from 1968-80 of Amnesty International
 David Etherington QC, Chancellor of the Diocese of London
 Michael Fitzgerald, Roman Catholic Cardinal archbishop and expert on Christian–Muslim relations
 Martin Fowler, software developer and author
 Prof. F. J. C. Hearnshaw, Professor of Mediaeval History from 1912–34 at King's College London
 Sir Gary Hickinbottom, High Court judge
 Prof Sir Harry Hinsley, historian and cryptanalyst
 Jeffrey Holland, actor
 David Howarth, academic and Liberal Democrat MP from 2005-10 for Cambridge
 Rupert Moon, Rugby Union international for Wales
 Sir Henry Newbolt, poet, novelist and historian
 Sir Harmar Nicholls, 1st Baronet, Conservative MP from 1950-74 for Peterborough
 Andrew Peach, radio presenter
 Terry Pitt, political researcher and adviser, Labour MEP from 1984-6 for Midlands West
 Sir Edwin Thomas Smith, Australian brewer, businessman, councillor, mayor, politician and philanthropist
 John Somers, 1st Baron Somers, Lord Chancellor of England, 1697–1700, member of the committee which drafted the Bill of Rights
 Bryan Stanley, trade union leader
 Maurice Wiggin (1912–1986), journalist and memoirist
 Frank Windsor, actor

References

External links

1554 establishments in England
Educational institutions established in the 1550s
Grammar schools in Walsall
Academies in Walsall